Mark Jacobus Louis Neeleman (born 16 April 1959, in Baghdad, Iraq) is a sailor from the Netherlands. Since the Netherlands did boycott the Moscow Olympic Games Neeleman represented his National Olympic Committee at the 1980 Summer Olympics in Tallinn, USSR under the Dutch NOC flag. Neeleman took 8th place in the 1980 Summer Olympics, which was boycotted by several countries. In 1984 Summer Olympics, Los Angeles Neeleman did a second attempt in the Finn and finished on the 9th place. Neeleman missed the selection for the 1988 Olympics, Pusan.

After that he switched to the Star. With crew member Jos Schrier at the 1992 Summer Olympics in Barcelona Neeleman took 4th place. Again in the Star and again with Jos Schrier, Neeleman took 6th place in the 2000 Summer Olympics, Sydney. His last Olympic appearance was in the 2004 Athens Olympics. This time with crew member Peter van Niekerk, Neeleman took 14th place in the Star.

Besides his Olympic sailing career Mark Neeleman took the World Championship J/22 and became in total 16 times Dutch Champion over several different classes. Among them there were titles in the Youth class, O-Jolle, Finn, Regenboog, J/22, Dragon. Neeleman was tactician on Favonius Swann 8o ft 3rd worlds and tactician/co-helmsman on Rainbow J-Class 2012/2013

Further reading

1980 Olympics (Tallinn)

1984 Olympics (Long Beach)

1992 Olympics (Barcelona)

2000 Olympics (Sydney)

2004 Olympics (Athens)

References

Living people
1959 births
Sportspeople from Baghdad
Dutch male sailors (sport)
Sailors at the 1980 Summer Olympics – Finn
Sailors at the 1984 Summer Olympics – Finn
Sailors at the 1992 Summer Olympics – Star
Sailors at the 2000 Summer Olympics – Star
Sailors at the 2004 Summer Olympics – Star
Olympic sailors of the Netherlands
Laser class sailors
O-Jolle class sailors
Dragon class sailors